Helicia polyosmoides is a species of plant in the family Proteaceae. It is endemic to Papua New Guinea.  It is threatened by habitat loss. This taxon was described by Don Foreman in 1985.

References

Flora of Papua New Guinea
polyosmoides
Critically endangered plants
Taxonomy articles created by Polbot
Taxa named by Don Foreman